P. C. Suppiah (born 10 August 1949) is a Malaysia-born Singaporean former athlete. His full name may be P. Chinakaruppan Suppiah or Phang Cue Suppiah. He was Singapore's first long-distance runner at the Olympics.

Suppiah was born in Malacca Town, in the Malaysian state of Malacca. He moved to Singapore as a child after his father's death. Suppiah became a citizen of Singapore one day before competing in the 1971 Southeast Asian Peninsular Games, where he won a gold medal in the 10,000 metres and a silver in the 5000 metres. A year later, he competed for Singapore at the 1972 Summer Olympics in the men's 5000 metres and 10,000 metres events. At the 1973 Southeast Asian Peninsular Games, he won a silver medal in the 5000 metres event.

References

External links
 
 

1949 births
Living people
Singaporean male long-distance runners
Olympic athletes of Singapore
Athletes (track and field) at the 1972 Summer Olympics
Southeast Asian Games medalists in athletics
Southeast Asian Games gold medalists for Singapore
Southeast Asian Games silver medalists for Singapore
Competitors at the 1971 Southeast Asian Peninsular Games
Competitors at the 1973 Southeast Asian Peninsular Games
People from Malacca